Qeshlaq-e Iman Quyi Mashhad Ali (also Romanized as Qeshlāq-e Īmān Qūyī Mashhad ʿAlī) is a village in Qeshlaq-e Gharbi Rural District, Aslan Duz District, Parsabad County, Ardabil Province, Iran. At the 2006 census, its population was 286, in 53 families.

References 

Towns and villages in Parsabad County